The Never Ending Tour is the popular name for Bob Dylan's endless touring schedule since June 7, 1988. In 2011, Dylan played a total of 89 shows, split across four legs, with shows in Asia, Oceania, Europe, and the US.

Background
The tour started off with a concert in Taiwan, the first of Dylan's career. Then he, along with his band, performed two concerts in China, one in Beijing and one in Shanghai. These concerts were controversial and deemed by the media as Dylan 'selling out'.
Dylan however did not see it that way at all. The concerts amongst the Chinese audience were successful.

After completing a tour of Asia and moving across to Australia and New Zealand, Dylan and the band performed an 11 date tour of Europe visiting several festivals such as Live at the Marquee, London Feis, Summer Sound Festival, Bergen Calling and Peace & Love.

Dylan and the band toured the United States during July and August performing 28 concerts in 22 States. Dylan performed as part of the Orange County Fair in Costa Mesa, California on July 15 and Meadow Brooks Music Festival in Rochester Hills, Michigan on August 7. Dylan returned to Europe in the fall of the year to perform a string of concerts with Mark Knopfler.

Set lists

Tour dates

Band
Bob Dylan – vocals, harmonica, organ, guitar
Tony Garnier – bass
Donnie Herron – violin, electric mandolin, pedal steel, lap steel
Stu Kimball – guitar
George Recelli – drums
Charlie Sexton – guitar

Notes

References

External links
BobLinks – Comprehensive log of concerts and set lists
Bjorner's Still on the Road – Information on recording sessions and performances

Bob Dylan concert tours
2011 concert tours
Concerts at Malmö Arena